Ludwig Späth (1793–1883) was a German botanist and nurseryman. He was father of Franz Ludwig Späth. The Common Lilac cultivar 'Andenken an Ludwig Späth' (French: 'Souvenir de Louis Spaeth') is named in his honour.

References

19th-century German botanists
Nurserymen
1793 births
1883 deaths